Terence Patrick Gilroy (8 March 1902 – 21 March 1984) was a New Zealand rugby union and professional rugby league footballer who played representative rugby league (RL) for New Zealand national team in 1924. Joined 28th Maori Battalion 1939–1943; attained rank of captain.

Playing career
Gilroy switched to rugby league with the Marist Old Boys club when they were expelled from the Canterbury Rugby Union in 1924. Gilroy was so successful that he was selected to represent New Zealand that year in two Test matches against the Australia team. In August 1924, he played for New Zealand against the England team in Auckland.

Gilroy joined Waimairi in 1927.

References

New Zealand rugby league players
New Zealand national rugby league team players
Canterbury rugby league team players
Papanui Tigers players
New Zealand rugby union players
Rugby union wings
Rugby league wingers
Place of birth missing
Place of death missing
1902 births
1982 deaths